"Still Waiting" was the third US single from Prince's second album, Prince. It was Prince's first ballad to be released as a single and was mildly popular on the R&B chart, reaching #65. The ballad speaks from the perspective of a young man who hasn't yet found love but yearns for it. The track is mainly piano, acoustic guitar and synth-based and was often played live with extended instrumental solos and audience teasing. The song is a more traditional R&B ballad, before Prince established himself with trademark sexual romps like "Do Me, Baby" and "International Lover".

The song was remade by Rainy Davis in 1987 and appeared on her album Sweetheart.  Her version was also released as a single and charted higher than Prince's version on the R&B chart, reaching #41.

British female duo Dorothy covered the song in 1988, peaking at #81 on the UK Singles Chart.

Bambi
The B-side of the song was the album track rocker, "Bambi". In Belgium, "Bambi" was released as a single with "Still Waiting" as the B-side.

References

Prince (musician) songs
Songs written by Prince (musician)
1980 singles
Warner Records singles
1979 songs
Song recordings produced by Prince (musician)